The Utrecht Museum Night (Utrechtse Museumnacht) is an annual event in the Dutch city of Utrecht, first organised in 2001.  It involves the following museums:
Nederlands Spoorwegmuseum
Sterrenwacht Sonnenborgh
Universiteitsmuseum
Dick Brunahuis/Centraal Museum
Museum Speelklok
Aboriginal Art Museum
Museum Catharijneconvent
Geldmuseum

Events in Utrecht (city)